GDR Amigos de Urgeses is a Portuguese sports team from Urgezes, in Guimarães, Portugal. 

It is a very well known team in the Braga district, and has an important work with social affairs in the city of Guimarães, also being a cultural promoter.

External links
Official website

Sports teams in Portugal